Tonsilliphilus suis is a species of bacteria from the family Dermatophilaceae which has been isolated from a submandibular lymph node of a pig.

References

Micrococcales
Bacteria described in 2013
Monotypic bacteria genera